Qareh Said (also Romanized as Qareh Sa‘īd; also known as Seyt) is a village in Zavkuh Rural District, Pishkamar District, Kalaleh County, Golestan Province, Iran. At the 2006 census, its population was 204, in 37 families.

References 

Populated places in Kalaleh County